Marie Isabelle Gabrielle Angélique de Saint-Nectaire, Duchesse de La Ferté-Senneterre (née de La Mothe-Houdancourt; 1654 - 1726) was a French noblewoman and court official who served as the Governess of the Children of France from 1709 to 1710.

Biography 
Marie Isabelle Gabrielle Angélique de La Mothe-Houdancourt was born in 1654 to Philippe de La Mothe-Houdancourt and Louise de Prie. Her father was the Duke of Cardona and served as the Viceroy of Catalonia and as Marshal of France. Her mother was a member of the French court who served as the Royal Governess for the children of Louis XIV and Louis, Grand Dauphin. She had two sisters, Charlotte Eléonore (the duchess of Ventadour) and Françoise Angélique (the duchess of Aumont).

She married Henri François de Saint Nectaire, Duc de La Ferté-Senneterre and had two children, Françoise Charlotte de Saint-Nectaire and the Marquise de Lévis-Mirepoix. Through her marriage she was the Duchess of La Ferté-Senneterre.

From 1709 until 1710 she served as the Governess of the Children of France at Versailles, an office previously held by her mother. As Royal Governess, she was in charge of the education of the children of Louis, Duke of Burgundy. She was succeeded in the role by her sister Charlotte Eléonore, Duchesse de Ventadour.

At the death of her mother in 1709, she inherited the Château de Montpoupon, which, after her death in 1726, would be inherited by her daughter, Françoise Charlotte.

References 

1654 births
1726 deaths
17th-century French women
18th-century French women
French duchesses
Governesses to the Children of France
Court of Louis XIV